Nina Hemmingsson (born 30 November 1971) is a Swedish cartoonist. She draws foremost shorter comics, often single-panel cartoons featuring political and social criticism. An example of Hemingsson's work is Bäst i början ("Best in the Beginning"). Her work has been published in the magazines Galago and Bang, the Uppsala student newspaper Ergo, and the newspaper Aftonbladet. She has also released three books, Hjälp! ("Help!"), Jag är din flickvän nu ("I'm Your Girlfriend Now"), and Demoner - ett bestiarium ("Demons - a Bestiary") for the publisher Ruin. Ahead of the 2010 wedding of Victoria, Crown Princess of Sweden, and Daniel Westling she made an anti-royalistic cartoon called "Prinsessan & Gemålen" for Aftonbladet.

Nina Hemingsson got her education at Kunstakademien in Trondheim in Norway and is currently living in Aspudden.

Cartoons
2004 – Hjälp!: serier. Stockholm: Kartago. 
2006 – Jag är din flickvän nu. Stockholm: Kartago. 
2007 – Roos, Harry; Hemmingsson Nina. Demoner: ett bestiarium. Stockholm: Ruin.  (inb.)
2007 – Edlund, Ann-Catrine; Erson Eva, Milles Karin, Hemmingsson Nina, Frödin Ulf. Språk och kön. Stockholm: Norstedts akademiska förlag.  (inb.)
2008 – Jonsson Mats, Mohr Sanna, Wedberg Sannie, red. Tilt: serier om droger och alkohol. Stockholm: ALMAeuropa. 
2009 – Teckningar och skisser. Malmö: Seriefrämjandet. 
2009 – Så jävla normal: teckningar 2006-2009. Stockholm: Kartago. 
2009 – Bild & Bubbla #177. Seriefrämjandet. 
2010 – Nyberg Andreas, red. Den totalt förbjudna dassboken. Sundbyberg: Semic. 
2011 – Mina vackra ögon. Kartago Förlag.  (inb.)
2012 – Det var jag som kom hem till dig. Stockholm: Atlas. 
2012 – Nina Hemmingsson almanacka 2014. Kartago Förlag. 
2013 – Nina Hemmingsson almanacka 2014. Kartago Förlag.

References

External links 

Living people
1971 births
Swedish cartoonists
Swedish women cartoonists